Frank Tomlinson (1925–2007) was a footballer who played as a winger in the Football League for Oldham Athletic, Rochdale and Chester.

References

1925 births
2007 deaths
Footballers from Manchester
Association football wingers
English footballers
Oldham Athletic A.F.C. players
Rochdale A.F.C. players
Chester City F.C. players
Ashton United F.C. players
English Football League players